The Bolivian Yungas is a tropical and subtropical moist broadleaf forest ecoregion in the Yungas of central Bolivia.

Setting
It forms a transition zone between the Southwest Amazon moist forests to the northeast and the Central Andean puna and wet puna to the southwest.

Climate
The climate in this ecoregion varies from tropical rainforest to tropical monsoon. Fog and rain deposited by northern trade winds contribute to the high humidity and precipitation of the Yungas.

Flora
Epiphytes are abundant and include bromeliads, orchids, and tree-ferns (Cyathea). Chusquea bamboo is an indicator species of the ecoregion.

Fauna
Mammals found in this ecoregion include the spectacled bear (Tremarctos ornatus), Geoffroy's cat (Leopardus geoffroyi), lowland tapir (Tapirus terrestris), jaguar (Panthera onca), jaguarundi (Herpailurus yagouaroundi), pacarana (Dinomys branickii), and dwarf brocket deer (Mazama chunyi).

Interesting bird species include the diademed tapaculo (Scytalopus schulenbergi), green-capped tanager (Stilpnia meyerdeschauenseei), Andean cock-of-the-rock (Rupicola peruvianus), and southern helmeted curassow (Pauxi unicornis).

Human use
The Bolivian Yungas is the center of the Afro-Bolivian community.

The Yungas Road, known for being dangerous, connects La Paz to the Bolivian Yungas.

Protected areas
Steep terrain, high precipitation, and difficult access have kept much of this ecoregion in a natural state. 49.37% of the ecoregion is in protected areas. They include:
Amboró National Park
Bahuaja-Sonene National Park
Carrasco National Park
Cotapata National Park and Integrated Management Natural Area
Espejillos Natural Monument
Incacasani Altamachi National Park
Isiboro Sécure National Park and Indigenous Territory
Madidi National Park
Pilón Lajas Biosphere Reserve and Communal Lands
Tunari National Park

References

Bolivian Yungas
Ecoregions of the Andes
Ecoregions of Peru
Ecoregions of Bolivia
Forests of Bolivia
Forests of Peru
Neotropical tropical and subtropical moist broadleaf forests
Montane forests